Mercedes-Benz SLR is a designation shared by two cars: 
 Mercedes-Benz 300 SLR, a 1955 sports racing car developed by Daimler-Benz
 Mercedes-Benz SLR McLaren, a 2004 road car co-developed by DaimlerChrysler and McLaren